Oscar Lee Brown (February 8, 1946 – June 3, 2020) was an American professional baseball player, an outfielder who appeared in all or parts of five seasons for the Atlanta Braves of Major League Baseball. He is a brother of two other professional athletes: Willie F. Brown, an NFL running back in the 1960s, and "Downtown" Ollie Brown, an outfielder who had a 13-year Major League career.

Brown was born in Long Beach, California, and attended the Polytechnic there and the University of Southern California before being chosen by the Braves in the first round of the secondary draft in June 1966.

Brown joined the Braves' roster September 3, 1969. In 160 Major League games, he collected 77 hits, including four home runs, 14 doubles and two triples. His only full season with the Braves was his last MLB campaign, .

Brown died on June 3, 2020.

References

External links

1946 births
2020 deaths
African-American baseball players
Atlanta Braves players
Baseball players from Long Beach, California
Kinston Eagles players
Richmond Braves players
Shreveport Braves players
USC Trojans baseball players
West Palm Beach Braves players
Yakima Braves players
20th-century African-American sportspeople
21st-century African-American people
Long Beach Polytechnic High School alumni